Lebanese diaspora refers to Lebanese migrants and their descendants who emigrated from Lebanon and now reside in other countries. There are more Lebanese living outside Lebanon (over 4 million), than within the country (4 million citizens). The diaspora population consists of Christians, Muslims, Druze, and Jewish. The Christians trace their origin to several waves of emigration, starting with the exodus that followed the 1860 Lebanon conflict in Ottoman empire.

Under the current Lebanese nationality law, diaspora Lebanese do not have an automatic right to return to Lebanon. Varying degrees of assimilation and a high degree of inter-ethnic marriages in the Lebanese diaspora communities, regardless of religious affiliation, caused most diaspora Lebanese not to have passed fluency in Arabic to their children although they still maintain a Lebanese ethnic identity.

The largest diaspora by far resides in Brazil, with between 5 and 7 million, followed by Colombia and Argentina, with about 1 to 3 million each, but it may be an exaggeration, given that an official survey conducted by the Brazilian Institute of Geography and Statistics (IBGE) showed that fewer than 1 million Brazilians claimed any Middle-Eastern origin.

Demographics
Although there are no reliable figures, the diaspora is estimated to be around 4 to 14 million people, far more than the internal population of Lebanon of around 4.6 million citizens in 2020. According to other estimates, the number of Lebanese living outside the country is thought to at least double the number of citizens living inside, which means at least 8 million people. Of the diaspora, 1.2 million are Lebanese citizens.

History
The Lebanese diaspora has always been a target to the Lebanese state to create institutional connection. In 1960 the World Lebanese Cultural Union was established under the authority of the President Fu’ad Chehab.

France has always been an important destination for the Lebanese diaspora, because Lebanon used to be a French colony and because French language is massively spoken in Lebanon.

The Lebanese diaspora, while historically trade-related, has more recently been linked to the Lebanese Civil War, with many Lebanese emigrating to Western countries. Because of the economic opportunities, many Lebanese have also worked in the Arab World, most notably Arab states of the Persian Gulf such as Saudi Arabia and Kuwait. Currently around 61% of Lebanese citizens resident in Lebanon are Muslim, around 34% are Christian, and about 5% Druze.

The Americas have long been a destination for Lebanese migration, with Lebanese arriving in some countries at least as early as the nineteenth century. The largest concentration of Lebanese outside the Middle East is in Brazil, which has, according to some sources, at least 6 million Brazilians of Lebanese ancestry, making Brazil's population of Lebanese greater than the entire population of Lebanon. According to a research conducted by IBGE in 2008, covering only the states of Amazonas, Paraíba, São Paulo, Rio Grande do Sul, Mato Grosso and Distrito Federal, 0.9% of white Brazilian respondents said they had family origins in the Middle East

There are also other large Lebanese communities elsewhere in South America, including Argentina, Colombia, Paraguay and Venezuela. Many Lebanese have also been settled for quite some time in the United States, Australia, France, Canada, the United Kingdom, South Africa and in the European Union member states. In addition, sizable populations exist in the United Arab Emirates and Singapore, as well as West Africa, particularly Ivory Coast and Ghana.

A law passed in 2008 permitted Lebanese abroad to vote in Lebanese elections, starting in 2013.

Business networks and economic impacts
Many Lebanese entrepreneurs and business people worldwide have proved very successful in all kinds of sectors and contexts. Lebanese abroad are considered "rich, educated and influential." Remittances from Lebanese abroad to family members within the country were estimated at $8.9 billion in 2014 and accounted for 18% of the country's economy. However, there remains a great untapped potential for further collaboration and cooperation between the diaspora and the Lebanese in their home country. Foreign direct investment is below 7% of the GDP, and almost half the Lebanese population is in tertiary education.

Throughout its history, the Lebanese diaspora used the Lebanese identity to create strong networks to help its members out. Over the course of time, immigration has indeed yielded Lebanese "commercial networks" throughout the world. Lebanese migrants play an important role in assisting Lebanon and its people through financial support, touristic visits, starting businesses and trades.

Lebanese populations in the diaspora

The list below contains approximate figures for people of full or partial Lebanese descent by country of residence, largely taken from the iLoubnan diaspora map. Additional reliable cites have been provided where possible. Additional estimates have been included where they can be cited; where applicable, these are used in place of the iLoubnan figures. The figure below uses the data from the list and calculates the amount of Lebanese residents as a percentage of the total population of the respective country.

Note: An important percentage of Middle-Easterners in Argentina, Brazil, Colombia, Mexico, Venezuela, Bulgaria, Romania, Italy, Portugal and Spain are of Lebanese ancestry. They are denoted ** for this purpose.

Outreach to the Lebanese diaspora by the Lebanese government 
The Lebanese government increasingly sees the diaspora as a critical resource for investment and new immigrants. A 2016 television ad tried to entice Lebanese in the United States to move to Lebanon to help improve the standard of living.

The Lebanese government launched the DiasporaID program in August 2017 to better connect Lebanese abroad to Lebanon itself. Funding for the project was provided by USAID with an objective of improving foreign investment in Lebanon.

On August 8, 2017, Lebanese President Michel Aoun advocated children of Lebanese in the diaspora take on Lebanese citizenship during a speech to the Maronite Diaspora Institution at Baabda Palace.

Notable persons of Lebanese descent

Notable persons of Lebanese Christian descent 
Famous scientists of Lebanese descent include: Peter Medawar (Nobel Prize in Physiology and Medicine), Elias Corey (Nobel Prize in Chemistry), Michael Atiyah (Fields Medalist, Mathematics), Michael DeBakey (medical innovator), Mona Nemer (Canada's Chief Science Advisor) and geneticists Huda Zoghbi, Anthony Atala and Joanne Chory. Famous writers include William Peter Blatty, film director Alex Garland, Nassim Nicholas Taleb and screenwriters and film producers Geoff Johns, Tony Thomas, Ronald Schwary, Tomas Langmann, Mario Kassar and Michael Tadross.

Prominent members of the Lebanese diaspora include Presidents and Vice-Presidents, e.g. Michel Temer (Brazil), Julio Teodoro Salem, Abdalá Bucaram, Alberto Dahik, Jamil Mahuad (all in Ecuador), Jacobo Majluta Azar, Luis Abinader (Dominican Republic), Julio Cesar Turbay (Colombia), Alberto Abdala (Uruguay) and Mario Abdo (current president of Paraguay). Other famous politicians include Ralph Nader, 2000, 2004 and 2008 US presidential candidate, Alex Azar current United States Secretary of Health, Spencer Abraham former United States Secretary of Energy, Mark Esper former United States Secretary of Defense, John Sununu former White House Chief of Staff, Darrell Issa US politician, George J. Mitchell US Politician and Peace Envoy, Charlie Crist Governor of Florida, Philip Habib US Politician and Peace Envoy, politician and author Jeanine Pirro, US Representative Donna Shalala, and Edward Seaga Prime Minister of Jamaica.

Notable military and astronauts include US army general John Abizaid, Navy Seal and Medal of Honor recipient Michael Monsoor as well as astronaut and Congressional Space Medal of Honor recipient Christa McAuliffe. Computer scientists include Richard Rashid, Jerrier Haddad, Tony Fadell and Jean Paoli.

Famous businessmen of Lebanese descent include Carlos Slim Helú, Carlos Ghosn, Nicolas Hayek, John J. Mack, Jacques Nasser, Debra Cafaro, Joseph J Jacobs, Lucie Salhany, Kevin O' Leary, Marcus Lemonis and famous names in entertainment like Danny Thomas, Marlo Thomas, Salma Hayek, Shakira, Jenna Dewan, Terrence Malick, Tom Shadyac, Tony Shalhoub, Tiffany, Jim Backus, Jane Wiedlin, Kristy McNichol, Zoe Saldana, James Stacy, Catherine Keener, Vince Vaughn, Amy Yasbeck, Khrystyne Haje, Skandar Keynes, Jace Norman, Morena Baccarin, Barbara Mori, Omar Sharif, Ricardo Darin, Xavier Dolan, Damian Bichir, Paul Anka, Emilio Stefan, Drake's long time producers and Grammy winners Noah "40" Shebib and Oliver El-Khatib, Alfredo Bojalil, Oscar-winning composer Gabriel Yared, guitarists Dick Dale, Tommy Bolin and G. E. Smith, Armand Van Helden, Tyler Joseph, Jack Barakat, Bazzi, Thomas Rhett, Patrick Gemayel, Mika, models Yamila Diaz-Rahi, Daniella Sarahyba and Zaira Nara; and sportsmen like Doug Flutie, Rony Seikaly, Marcos Bagdhatis, Patrick Maroon, Johnny Manziel, surfers Kelly Slater and Maya Gabeira, winner of the Indy 500 Bobby Rahal, FIFA World Cup record holder Mario Zagallo, chess Grandmaster Jennifer Shahade and Olympic medalists Jordyn Wieber, Florencia Habif, Matt Abood and Thaisa Daher.

See also

Arab diaspora
Constitution of Lebanon
Driving licence in Lebanon
Foreign relations of Lebanon
History of Lebanon
Lebanese identity card
Lebanese passport
List of Lebanese people
Little Syria, Manhattan
Politics of Lebanon
Vehicle registration plates of Lebanon
Visa policy of Lebanon
Visa requirements for Lebanese citizens

Notes

References

External links 
The Lebanese Demographic Reality Lebanese Information Center, reviewed by Statistics Lebanon. 14 January 2013.
Moise A. Khayrallah Center for Lebanese Diaspora Studies at North Carolina State University
KUSUMO, Fitra Ismu, "ISLAM EN AMERICA LATINA Tomo I: La expansión del Islam y su llegada a América Latina (Spanish Edition)"
KUSUMO, Fitra Ismu, "ISLAM EN AMÉRICA LATINA Tomo II: Migración Árabe a América Latina y el caso de México (Spanish Edition)" 
KUSUMO, Fitra Ismu, "ISLAM EN AMÉRICA LATINA Tomo III: El Islam hoy desde América Latina (Spanish Edition)"